Diana Mikhailovna Pervushkina (born 23 June 1998) is a Russian former competitive figure skater.

Personal life 
Diana Mikhailovna Pervushkina was born on 22 June 1999 in Tolyatti, Russia.

Career 
Making her senior national debut, Pervushkina finished 3rd at the 2014 Russian Championships.Бронзовый призёр Юношеского Первенства России 2014 (Нижний Новгород). Серебряный призёр среди взрослых этапа Кубка России 2013 (Пермь). Победительница среди юниоров Мемориала Н.А. Панина 2012 (Санкт-Петербург). Участница Чемпионата России 2014 (Сочи

2014–15 season 
Pervushkina debuted internationally in the 2014–15 season, placing 5th on the 2014–15 Junior Grand Prix (JGP) series in Japan. At the Russian national championships, she finished 13th on the senior level and 10th on the junior level. At the end of the season, Pervushkina left her longtime coaches, Irina Baranova and Ilia Korzhov, to train under Evgeni Rukavicin in Saint Petersburg.

2015–16 season 
Pervushkina started her season by finishing 4th at her JGP event in Linz, Austria before winning her first JGP medal, bronze, in Zagreb, Croatia. She finished 13th at the Russian Championships in Yekaterinburg. On January 21–23, Pervuhskina competed at the Russian Junior Championships finishing in last place amongst a field of 18 qualified skaters.

Programs

Competitive highlights 
CS: Challenger Series; JGP: Junior Grand Prix

References

1998 births
Living people
Russian female single skaters
Sportspeople from Tolyatti
Figure skaters from Saint Petersburg